The Concerto for Orchestra is an orchestral composition in five movements by the American composer Jennifer Higdon.  The work was commissioned by the Philadelphia Orchestra with contributions from the National Endowment for the Arts, the Philadelphia Music Project, and Peter Benoliel.  It was premiered at the Kimmel Center for the Performing Arts in Philadelphia June 12, 2002, with conductor Wolfgang Sawallisch leading the Philadelphia Orchestra.

Composition
The Concerto for Orchestra has a duration of roughly 35 minutes and is composed in five numbered movements.

Instrumentation
The piece is scored for three flutes (3rd doubling piccolo), three oboes, two clarinets, bass clarinet, two bassoons, contrabassoon, four French horns, three trumpets, three trombones, tuba, harp, piano, celesta, timpani, three percussionists, and strings.

Reception
Andrew Farach-Colton of Gramophone praised the Concerto for Orchestra, saying, "One expects a concerto to be virtuosic, and Higdon peppers this one with solos for the first-desk players, while also offering plenty of opportunity for more general orchestral muscle flexing."  Reviewing a performance by the Mannes College The New School for Music Orchestra, Allan Kozinn of The New York Times lauded the piece as "accessible but technically demanding" and wrote, "Like the concertos for orchestra by Bartok and Lutoslawski, this is a showpiece that makes demands on every section and often calls for unusual timbres: the quickly descending violin glissandos, which create an almost electronic effect in the third movement, for example, or the eerie bowed percussion sounds that open the fourth."  Kozinn further remarked:

Conversely, Andrew Clements of The Guardian called the piece "supremely forgettable" and "an example of American contemporary music at its most vacuous, a noisy mishmash of early 20th-century styles".

Recordings 
The first recording of this work was released by Telarc on March 23, 2004 with a recording of Higdon's work City Scape (2002). It was performed by the Atlanta Symphony Orchestra under the baton of Robert Spano. The track listing is as follows;

Concerto For Orchestra

1: I (8:04)

2: II (4:34)

3: III (10:31)

4: IV (5:36)

5: V (6:13)

City Scape

6: SkyLine (7:07)

7: River Sings A Song To Trees (17:39)

8: Peachtree Street (6:06)

See also
List of compositions by Jennifer Higdon

References

Concertos by Jennifer Higdon
2002 compositions
21st-century classical music
Higdon
Music commissioned by the Philadelphia Orchestra